ETV2 is the second channel of the Estonian Public Broadcasting (Eesti Rahvusringhääling  – ERR) focusing on children's programming during the day and providing cultural content in the evening.

ETV2 is known for its quality art house feature film and documentary selection.

The flagship in-house production is a cultural talk show.

ETV2 began broadcasting on 8 August 2008.

References

External links

Television channels in Estonia
Television channels and stations established in 2008
2008 establishments in Estonia
Mass media in Tallinn
Eesti Rahvusringhääling